James Russell Carpenter Jr. (December 17, 1927 – June 10, 2006) was an American politician who served for two terms in the Vermont House of Representatives. A member of the Democratic Party, he was defeated for reelection by Republican Mary Madkour in 1992.

Electoral history

References

External links
 

1927 births
2006 deaths
Democratic Party members of the Vermont House of Representatives
20th-century American politicians